Tralee Castle was a medieval strategic castle in Tralee, Kerry, owned by the Denny family from 1586. It is now a ruin.

The castle was built by the Desmond family, likely in the mid-thirteenth century at a similar time to the constriction of the nearby Castle Maine. It became a seat of the Earls of Desmond and was damaged in 1580 during the Second Desmond Rebellion. In 1586 the castle and town were granted to Sir Edward Denny, and restored by his son, Sir Edward Denny, in 1627. The castle was besieged during the Irish Rebellion of 1641 and burnt by Irish rebels in 1642. In 1653 the castle was restored by Sir Arthur Denny. In 1691 the castle was again damaged in the Williamite War in Ireland and then rebuilt as a manor house by Colonel Edward Denny. In 1804, Sir Edward Denny, 3rd Baronet undertook work to modernise the manor, but these were unsuccessful and he directed the demolition of the remaining structure in 1826.

References

Castles in County Kerry